The 1932 Dayton Flyers football team was an American football team that represented the University of Dayton as a member of the Ohio Athletic Conference during the 1932 college football season. In its tenth season under head coach Harry Baujan, the team compiled a 9–2 record.

Schedule

References

Dayton
Dayton Flyers football seasons
Dayton Flyers football